Garfield on the Town is a 1983 animated television special, directed by Phil Roman and based on the Garfield comic strip by Jim Davis. It once again starred Lorenzo Music as the voice of Garfield (who also co-wrote the special with Davis), and also featured the voices of Thom Huge, Gregg Berger and Julie Payne.

The special was first broadcast October 28, 1983 on CBS. It won the Primetime Emmy Award for Outstanding Animated Program and has been released on LaserDisc and DVD.

This is the second of twelve Garfield television specials made between 1982 and 1991.

Plot 
Jon Arbuckle becomes concerned about Garfield and his behavior after he and Odie mess up his house during the special's opening credits. While Jon drives him to the pet hospital, Garfield accidentally falls out of Jon's car and ends up getting lost in downtown. Garfield runs into a large gang of unfriendly alley cats known as the Claws. After Garfield antagonizes the gang's leader, he flees into an abandoned Italian restaurant, where he is reunited with his estranged mother, Sonja. The building was actually Garfield's birthplace and where he inherited for his love for lasagna. Jon later calls a local newspaper to run a Lost and Found ad to find Garfield, though he decides to cut his ad short as it would cost him too much money for a full size-ad description.

The next day, Garfield meets the rest of his extended family, including his sickly half-brother Raoul, his cousin Sly, who is the security guard on watch for the Claws, and his tough maternal grandfather. Garfield is appalled to learn that everyone in his entire family are mousers. Meanwhile, the Claws finally track Garfield down, surround the entire building, and demand Garfield to come out. However, the family decides to fight the Claws instead of giving up Garfield to them. Garfield hides cowardly while his family fights the Claws and defeats them. Garfield's grandfather tells him that he is supposed to live with Jon instead. Reassured by Sonja that they all envy his normal life at Jon's house, Garfield tearfully says goodbye to his entire family and leaves. Frightened, tired and hungry, Garfield walks along a deserted street as it starts to rain. A car drives by, and Garfield realizes that the vehicle belongs to Jon. Garfield chases Jon's car until he collapses on the sidewalk from exhaustion. When Odie finally spots Garfield unconscious, Jon pulls over to rescue him. Jon drives Garfield home and later puts him into bed for the night.

Garfield wakes up at Jon's house the next day and wonders if his entire experience with his family was real or not. Garfield glimpses Sonja looking at him through the window. As Sonja leaves Jon's house, Garfield smiles and emotionally whispers to her: "Thanks Mom, for everything".

Voice cast

Songs

Production 
 
Lee Mendelson and Bill Melendez, best known for the Peanuts specials, produced Garfield on the Town. The special was directed by Phil Roman, who had previously directed Here Comes Garfield in 1982. It was the last Garfield special Roman directed before founding his own company called Film Roman to produce the specials himself, starting with Garfield in the Rough (1984).

The special marks the first time the character of Jon Arbuckle is voiced by Thom Huge. Sandy Kenyon originally voiced Jon in Here Comes Garfield. Huge later voiced Jon in the remaining specials and in the Garfield and Friends TV series.

Broadcast and release 
The special was originally aired on CBS on October 28, 1983, and was viewed by 40 million people. It has been re-broadcast in subsequent years. Ballantine Books published a 64-page illustrated book adaptation in 1983.
 
In July 2004, Garfield on the Town was released on the DVD Garfield as Himself, along with Here Comes Garfield (1982) and Garfield Gets a Life (1991). It was released on another DVD compilation, The Garfield Holiday Collection, on November 4, 2014, sold only by Walmart, and was also made available for digital download on November 11 that year.

Reception 
At the 36th Primetime Emmy Awards in 1984, Garfield on the Town won the Primetime Emmy Award for Outstanding Animated Program. Louisiana's The Town Talk'''s 1985 review called Garfield "outrageous" and said there was "popular demand" for the special.

In 2004, DVD Talk critic Randy Miller judged the Garfield as Himself specials to be "quite enjoyable," highlighting "a long-lost family reunion." In 2014, with the release of The Garfield Holiday Collection, Jim Davis identified Garfield on the Town'' as a personal favorite, explaining, "Garfield actually meets his mother on that. It was very special."

References

External links 

 
 

1980s American television specials
1980s animated television specials
1983 in American television
1983 television specials
1980s American animated films
CBS television specials
Television shows directed by Phil Roman
CBS original programming
Garfield television specials
Television shows written by Jim Davis (cartoonist)
Emmy Award-winning programs